"We Caa Done" is a song by Jamaican singer Popcaan, featuring vocals from Canadian rapper and singer Drake. It was released on 6 January 2023 through Drake's record label, OVO Sound, as the lead single from Popcaan's fifth studio album, Great Is He. The song was produced by Tresor and Batundi, and the former producer wrote it alongside both artists.

Background
Popcaan teased a snippet of "We Caa Done" two days before its release and confirmed all the details about it. The song received a positive review from Alphonse Pierre of Pitchfork, who felt that Popcaan's "two verses are filled with hypnotic moments, like the echo catching off his croons in the first or his impassioned, Auto-Tuned bellowing in the second" and Drake "doesn't have to do too much" as all he "has to do is manage the feel-good mood and let the nostalgia kick in". A dancehall song, Popcaan sings about his huge wealth and expensive lifestyle. Speaking about the song, he said through a press release: "'We Caa Done' is all about persevering. We don't think about limits. We're living the life we've dreamed of, and despite what the haters and naysayers have to say, we will only be greater".

Music video
The official music video for "We Caa Done", directed by Theo Skudra, premiered alongside the release of the song on 6 January 2023. It also includes appearances from Drake's previous collaborator, American rapper Lil Yachty, and American professional basketball player Kevin Durant. It was shot in the Turks & Caicos Islands and sees both Popcaan and Drake dancing while on a boat and riding jetskis in water.

Charts

References

2023 singles
2023 songs
Popcaan songs
Drake (musician) songs
Songs written by Drake (musician)